Maurice Doolittle Young (November 29, 1904 – November 28, 1984) was an American Negro league pitcher for the Kansas City Monarchs in 1927.

A native of Tatums, Oklahoma, Young was the younger brother of fellow Negro leaguer Tom Young. He died in Kansas City, Missouri in 1984 at age 79.

References

External links
 and Seamheads

1904 births
1984 deaths
Kansas City Monarchs players
Baseball pitchers
People from Carter County, Oklahoma
Baseball players from Oklahoma
20th-century African-American sportspeople